Arthur Edgar Perry FRCO (23 March 1864 – 26 April 1925) was an organist and composer based in England.

Life
He was born on 23 March 1864 in Harlow, Essex, the son of Alfred Perry and Martha Emma Robinson. As a boy he joined the choir of All Saints' Church, Hockerhill.

He trained at Peterborough Cathedral.

He married Elizabeth Mary Vickers on 8 August 1906 in Trinity Methodist Chapel, Crewe, and they had:
Geoffrey Alfred Vickers Perry 1910 - 1994
Arthur John Vickers Perry 1912-1984

He died suddenly on 26 April 1925.

Appointments
Organist of Elsenham Church, 1876
Organist at Winchester College
Organist of Old Malton Priory Church ca. 1890
Organist of Bridlington Priory
Organist of St. James' Church, Hatcham
Organist of Holy Trinity Church, Stepney
Organist of Holy Trinity Church, Lee
Organist of St. Hilda's Church, Crofton Park

Compositions
He composed music for organ and choir.

References

1864 births
1925 deaths
English organists
British male organists
English composers
Fellows of the Royal College of Organists